Bozhidar Brankov Chorbadzhiyski (born 8 August 1995) is a Bulgarian professional footballer who plays for Polish club Widzew Łódź. He is usually deployed as a centre back.

Career

CSKA Sofia 
Chorbadzhiyski joined CSKA Sofia as a nine-year-old in 2004 and subsequently progressed through CSKA's academy. On 25 May 2013, he made his competitive debut as a 32nd-minute substitute for Plamen Krachunov in a 2–1 league loss against Lokomotiv Sofia at Lokomotiv Stadium. On 4 April 2014, he signed his first professional contract.

Chorbadzhiyski began to establish himself in the CSKA first team from the 2015–16 season, making 26 league appearances. He scored his first senior goal of his career in a Bulgarian Cup match against Botev Ihtiman on 9 September 2015, which CSKA won 5–0. In that season he also collected his first trophy with the club, winning the 2015–16 Bulgarian Cup.

Loan to FCSB
On 20 August 2019 Chorbadzhiyski joined Romanian club FCSB on loan until end of the year, with a buyout clause.

International career 
On 26 May 2016 Chorbadzhiyski received his first call up for Bulgaria for the Kirin Cup, replacing the injured Plamen Galabov. He made his debut for the team on 6 September 2016 in a match against Luxembourg for the 2018 FIFA World Cup qualification, won by Bulgaria by a score of 4:3. His second game for the team was again a qualification match for the 2018 World Cup against the Netherlands on 25 March 2017, won by Bulgaria with 2-0.

Career statistics

Club
As of 30 November 2022

International

Honours

Club
CSKA Sofia
 Bulgarian Cup: 2015–16

FCSB
Cupa României: 2019–20

References

External links
 
 

1995 births
Living people
Footballers from Sofia
Bulgarian footballers
Bulgaria international footballers
PFC CSKA Sofia players
First Professional Football League (Bulgaria) players
Association football defenders
FC Steaua București players
Stal Mielec players
Widzew Łódź players
Liga I players
Ekstraklasa players
Expatriate footballers in Romania
Bulgarian expatriate sportspeople in Romania
Expatriate footballers in Poland
Bulgarian expatriate sportspeople in Poland